Virachey National Park is a national park in north-eastern Cambodia covering an area of .

The park is one of only two Cambodian ASEAN Heritage Parks. The park overlaps Ratanakiri and Stung Treng Provinces. The park's flora and fauna is threatened by illegal logging. Administration of the park is the responsibility of the Cambodian Ministry of Environment.

Description

Located in some of the most deep and isolated jungles of Cambodia, Virachey is largely unexplored and holds a large assortment of wildlife, waterfalls and mountains. The park comprises dense semi-evergreen lowlands, montane forests, upland savannah, bamboo thickets and occasional patches of mixed deciduous forest. Most of the area lies above 400 meters up to 1,500 meters.

References

Further reading
Baird, Ian G. "Making Spaces: The ethnic Brao people and the international border between Laos and Cambodia" in the journal Geoforum 41 (2010) 271-281
Baird, Ian G. and Philip Drearden "Biodiversity Conservation and Resource Tenure Regimes: A Case Study from Northeast Cambodia" in the journal Environmental Management Vol. 32, No.5, pp. 541–550
Bourdier, Frederic. The Mountain of Precious Stones: Ratanakiri, Cambodia. The Center for Khmer Studies, Phnom Penh, 2006.
Bourdier, Frederic. "Development and Dominion: Indigenous Peoples of Cambodia, Vietnam and Laos." White Lotus Press, Bangkok. 2009.
"Cambodia's Last Frontier Falls" by Stephen Kurczy in the Asia Times Online. 
 Conservation International Preliminary Report 2007

External links
Virachey National Park in the UNEP-WCMC World Database on Protected Areas (WDPA) from the World Conservation Monitoring Centre
Eco-Tourism in Virachey National Park 
Virachey National Park on Facebook

National parks of Cambodia
Geography of Ratanakiri province
Geography of Stung Treng province
Protected areas established in 1993
ASEAN heritage parks